Henricus acosmetes is a species of moth of the family Tortricidae. It was first described, as Phtheochroa acosmetes, by Józef Razowski, with a type locality in Durango, Mexico.

References

Henricus (moth)
Moths described in 1986
Taxa named by Józef Razowski